Linda "Sunni" Hughes (born 9 June 1968) is an Australian former women's association football player. She participated in 1995 FIFA Women's World Cup and 2000 Olympics. Hughes played professional club football in Denmark and Japan. In December 2013 she was inducted to Australia's Soccer Hall of Fame.

References

Living people
Australian women's soccer players
Footballers at the 2000 Summer Olympics
Olympic soccer players of Australia
1995 FIFA Women's World Cup players
Fortuna Hjørring players
Australian expatriate women's soccer players
Australia women's international soccer players
Speranza Osaka-Takatsuki players
Nadeshiko League players
Australian expatriate sportspeople in Denmark
Australian expatriate sportspeople in Japan
Expatriate women's footballers in Japan
Expatriate men's footballers in Denmark
1968 births
Women's association football forwards